Ningling County is a county under the prefecture-level city of Shangqiu, in the east of Henan province, People's Republic of China.

Administrative divisions
As 2012, this county is divided to 5 towns and 9 townships.
Towns

Townships

Climate

References

External links

 
County-level divisions of Henan
Shangqiu